Linton Brown (born 12 April 1968) is an English former professional footballer who played as a striker.

He scored 27 goals from 155 games in the Football League playing as a forward for Halifax Town, Hull City, Swansea City and Scarborough.

Playing career

Brown played non-League football for Bridlington Town, North Ferriby United, and Guiseley, before making three appearances in the Football League for Halifax Town in 1992 on a non-contract basis.

During the 1992–93 season he joined Hull City where he made his name in football, often a fans favourite. In his first season, he made 21 appearances scoring 3 goals. In the 1993–94 season for Hull City, Brown played 43 games for the club establishing himself as a first team favourite scoring 10 goals. Then backed up the following season with 12 goals for the club. However, in the 1995–96 season Brown scored only one goal and appeared in 26 games, and he was sold by Terry Dolan to Swansea City.
 
Injury disrupted his Swansea career; he scored three goals in 28 League games, finishing his Football League career on loan at Scarborough, before moving back into non-League football in 1998 with Emley and then Gainsborough Trinity.

After football

After retiring from playing, he worked behind the scenes at his former club Hull, as the commercial manager.

Brown was also the chief executive at Barnsley until January 2017 and in April of the same year was appointed as the head of commercial at Bolton Wanderers.

Since 2019, he has been employed by Blackpool as chief commercial officer.

Honours
Swansea City
Football League Third Division play-offs runner-up: 1997

References

1968 births
Living people
People from Driffield
English footballers
Association football forwards
North Ferriby United A.F.C. players
Guiseley A.F.C. players
Halifax Town A.F.C. players
Hull City A.F.C. players
Swansea City A.F.C. players
Scarborough F.C. players
Wakefield F.C. players
Gainsborough Trinity F.C. players
English Football League players
Sportspeople from Yorkshire
Hull City A.F.C. non-playing staff
Barnsley F.C. non-playing staff
Bolton Wanderers F.C. non-playing staff
Blackpool F.C. non-playing staff